California Proposition 11 may refer to:
 California Proposition 11 (1972)
 California Proposition 11 (2008)